Rede Voa, previously known as Voa São Paulo or Voa-SP in short, is a private Brazilian airports administration consortium, responsible for sixteen Brazilian regional and municipal airports administrative operations.

On March 15, 2017 Voa São Paulo was granted the concession to operate five airports by the government of the State of São Paulo, previously operated by DAESP.

On July 15, 2021 eleven airports managed by DAESP had their concessions auctioned to Voa São Paulo, under the name Consórcio Voa SE.

List of airports managed by Rede Voa
The following airports are managed by Rede Voa in 2022:

Added in 2019:
Bragança Paulista – Arthur Siqueira State Airport
Campinas – Campo dos Amarais–Pref. Francisco Amaral State Airport
Itanhaém – Antônio Ribeiro Nogueira Jr. State Airport
Jundiaí – Comte. Rolim Adolfo Amaro State Airport
Ubatuba – Gastão Madeira State Airport

Added in 2021:
Araraquara – Bartolomeu de Gusmão State Airport
Avaré / Arandu – Comte. Luiz Gonzaga Luth Regional Airport
Bauru / Arealva – Moussa Nakhl Tobias State Airport
Franca – Ten. Lund Presotto State Airport
Guaratinguetá – Edu Chaves Airport
Marília – Frank Miloye Milenkovich State Airport
Registro – Alberto Bertelli State Airport
Ribeirão Preto – Dr. Leite Lopes State Airport 
São Carlos – Mário Pereira Lopes State Airport
São Manuel – Nelson Garófalo Airport 
Sorocaba – Bertram Luiz Leupolz State Airport

See also

List of airports in Brazil
List of the busiest airports in Brazil

References

Airport operators
2017 establishments in Brazil